Pardeh may refer to:
 Pardeh, Ilam
 Pardeh, Khuzestan